Henry "Hank" Lundy (born January 3, 1984) is a professional American boxer. He has challenged once for the WBO junior welterweight title in 2016, having previously held the regional WBO–NABO lightweight title in 2010, and the NABF lightweight title from 2011 to 2012. On December 30, 2016 Lundy defeated John Delperdang for the vacant UBF  lightweight world title.

Early life 

Lundy's first love growing up was football; he earned a partial scholarship to play collegiate football at Kutztown University, but declined upon learning his aunt could not afford to send both him and his sister, Muneerah, to college. "Send my little sister", Lundy told his aunt, "and I'll find another way."

Lundy eventually took a liking to boxing at the age of 18 after knocking out a would-be schoolyard bully with an uppercut. "I put him to sleep", Lundy recalled. Fearing the repercussions, Lundy ran home to his uncle, who told him to put his quick hands to use. "People ain't fighting people – they're shooting people!" he told Lundy, "So get your butt in the gym!"

Amateur career 
Lundy took his family's advice and began a successful amateur boxing career in which he finished 65–5 overall and won the 2003 Pennsylvania Golden Gloves. Lundy also won a silver medal at the 2005 National Golden Gloves and won the Junior Lightweight Open Division championship at the Middle Atlantic Championships and East Central Championships before his amateur career ended with a narrow loss in the 2007 Pan-Am Games.

Professional career 
Lundy began his professional career in 2006 under the guidance of promoter Jimmy Burchfield Sr. and Classic Entertainment and Sports, defeating Steve Thomas by first-round knockout at the Cape Cod Melody Tent in Hyannis, Massachusetts.

Lundy quickly rose to 10–0 within the next 16 months, including wins in Providence, Rhode Island; Lincoln, Rhode Island; and Mashantucket, Connecticut, at Foxwoods Resort Casino, establishing an early reputation as one of boxing's most promising road warriors.

On March 28, 2008, Lundy faced his toughest test to date when he traveled to Salamanca, New York, to face undefeated hometown favorite Darnell Jiles Jr. at the Seneca Allegany Casino on ESPN's Friday Night Fights. The bout ended in a draw with all three judges scoring the fight, 38–38.

Lundy returned to ESPN two months later, facing another unbeaten prospect in Esteban Almarez. This time, Lundy earned the win, narrowly beating Almarez by unanimous decision, 38–37, 38–37, 38–36 at the Twin River Casino in Lincoln, Rhode Island.

A year later, Lundy earned a breakthrough victory, knocking out undefeated Jason Cintron, the younger brother of former world champion Kermit Cintron, in the fifth round of their scheduled eight-round bout at the Prudential Center in Newark, New Jersey, on April 24, 2009.

Lundy called out Cintron prior to the bout, questioning Cintron's background and predicting a knockout win. "I guarantee this fight will be over in three rounds", Lundy said. "I hold no punches in the ring. When you look at my resume, I'm fighting people that can fight. Who has he fought? There's a buzz going around that he's planning to knock me out. You have, what, three knockouts on paper? Look at my knockout ratio. Look at the type of guys I’m fighting. He's not on my level. He's nowhere in the same league as me."

Lundy breezed through his next three bouts, stopping former New England amateur standout Josh Beeman in the fifth round, knocking out Justo Sanchez in the sixth round of a scheduled 10-round bout two months later, and annihilating Aldo Valtierra in 2 minutes, 41 seconds at Mohegan Sun on October 31, 2009.

Lundy began 2010 with another tough challenge, facing former Cuban amateur standout Richard Abril at The Roxy in Boston, Massachusetts, on January 22. Despite getting knocked down in the sixth round on what appeared to be a slip, Lundy held on for a narrow, 98–91, 96–94, 94–95 split-decision victory to improve to 17–0–1.

With eight consecutive wins under his belt, Lundy issued a challenge to lightweights willing to face him in the ring. "Look at the records of the guys who I have fought", Lundy said. "I was fighting opponents with fifty-plus fights in my sixth bout. I have fought many veterans, undefeated guys and now contenders. I am ready for the next level, any lightweight out there, preferably in the top 10, because I know I am very close to realizing my dream to become world champion."

NABO championship 
Undefeated lightweight Tyrese Hendrix answered Lundy's challenge, agreeing to face Lundy on April 16, 2010 at the Omni New Daisy Theater in Memphis, Tennessee, for the vacant NABO lightweight title on Friday Night Fights.

Lundy dominated, knocking down Hendrix twice in the first and again in the sixth en route to a 98–90, 100–88, 99–88 unanimous-decision victory to capture the NABO title.

First career loss 
Three months after winning the title, Lundy made his first defense against John Molina Jr. in the main event of ESPN's Friday Night Fights at Twin River Casino in Lincoln, Rhode Island, on July 9, 2010.

Lundy's speed and power overwhelmed Molina through the first half of the fight before Molina sent Lundy to the canvas in the eighth round courtesy of a hard, overhand right. Lundy made it back to his feet, but struggled down the stretch; Molina caught Lundy against the ropes in the 11th round and finished him off with a flurry, prompting referee Ricky Gonzalez to stop the bout at the 2:18 mark.

Molina improved to 21–1 while Lundy dropped to 18–1–1.

Lundy returned to the ring five weeks later, again on ESPN, with a unanimous decision win over Omri Lowther in Montreal, Quebec – a fight Lundy agreed to take on three days' notice.

NABF championship 
Lundy earned another shot at a title on April 1, 2011 when he faced former Venezuelan Olympian Patrick Lopez for the vacant NABF lightweight championship on Friday Night Fights at Foxwoods Resort Casino.

Lundy sent Lopez to the canvas in the second round and ultimately won the fight by unanimous decision, 99–91, 97–92, 95–94.

The win was Lundy's second in a row since losing to Molina, improving his overall record to 20–1–1.

Showdown against David Diaz 
Four months after beating Lopez, Lundy again traveled to an opponent's backyard, agreeing to face former world champion and fan favorite David Diaz at the Horseshoe Casino in Hammond, Indiana, a short distance from Diaz's hometown of Chicago, Illinois.

The fight took place August 19, 2011 on ESPN. Lundy took control early before Diaz caught him with a right hook in the fourth round, sending Lundy tumbling to the canvas. Diaz tried desperately to end the fight in the fourth, but Lundy survived and eventually cut Diaz above the eye in the fifth. Referee Gerald Scott threatened to stop the fight due to the damage over Diaz's eye, but ultimately allowed the former world champion to continue. Lundy finished Diaz in the sixth with a left hand that put Diaz on his back 37 seconds into the round.

Second NABF title defense
After making his first title defense against Diaz, Lundy squared off against little-known power-puncher Dannie Williams of St. Louis, Missouri. Williams began the war of words in December by threatening to "hurt" Lundy if the two were to meet in the ring.

The match was scheduled as the 10-round main event of ESPN's Friday Night Fights on March 30, 2012, at the Foxwoods Resort Casino's MGM Grand Theater. After months of talk from both camps, Williams got off to a strong start, dropping Lundy with a hard right hand to the temple in the opening round. Lundy bounced back to dominant the final nine rounds in arguably his most impressive victory to date. Lundy won unanimously on all three scorecards, 97–92, 97–92, 98–91, utilizing his jab to neutralize Williams' counter-punching abilities.

Third NABF title defense
On July 27, 2012, Lundy defended his title against Mexican challenger Ray Beltran in the main event of ESPN's Friday Night Fights at Resorts Casino Hotel in Atlantic City, New Jersey. Lundy entered the fight ranked No. 1 among lightweights in the WBC. Beltran applied pressure throughout the fight, constantly driving Lundy against the ropes. Both fighters exchanged clean blows at the end of the third round, with Lundy striking Beltran at the bell, wobbling Beltran momentarily, but Beltran escaped with a 96–94, 96–94, 95–95 majority-decision, claiming the NABF crown and handing Lundy just the second loss of his professional career.

Move to 140-pound division
Following the loss to Beltran, Lundy moved up from lightweight to light welterweight and challenged then undefeated and No. 3 ranked World Boxing Council light welterweight contender Viktor Postol on March 21, 2013 in Kyiv, Ukraine. Lundy gave Postol his toughest test to date, particularly in the late rounds of their scheduled 12-round bout, but lost a 116-112, 116-112, 116-113 unanimous decision.

Shortly thereafter, Lundy returned to ESPN's Friday Night Fights in Salem, New Hampshire, to face 33-year-old Nigerian veteran Ajose Olusegun in the 10-round main event at Rockingham Park on July 19, 2013. Despite taking the fight on short notice, Lundy pieced together arguably his most impressive performance to date, dominating Olusegun to earn a 100-90, 98-92, 98-92 unanimous decision win. The win snapped Lundy's two-fight losing streak.

Return to prominence
With the win over Olusegun generating significant buzz in the boxing world, Lundy faced another tall task early in 2014 when he battled rising prospect and Cuban defector Angelo Santana in the main event of the Friday, Feb. 21, 2014 edition of ShoBox: The Next Generation, Lundy's first appearance on Showtime.

It was a breakthrough performance for Lundy, who outboxed Santana over 10 rounds at the Wolstein Center in Cleveland, Ohio, to win unanimously on all three scorecards, 98-91. Lundy sealed the lopsided victory with a knockdown in the ninth round.

Lundy returned to the ring on May 31, 2014 at Mohegan Sun in Uncasville, Connecticut, where he beat Mexican challenger Gerardo Cuevas, the son of former world champion Pipino Cuevas, via second-round knockout, his third consecutive win.

HBO debut

Lundy put his winning streak on the line in his HBO debut against NABF super lightweight champion Thomas Dulorme on December 6, 2014, at the Barclays Center in Brooklyn, New York. The two also fought for the vacant NABO title.

Dulorme sent Lundy to the canvas in the opening round of their scheduled 10-round bout, but Lundy made his push in the later rounds, at one point hurting Dulorme in the sixth with a hard left hook. Dulorme held on and won by split decision, 97-92, 96-93, 93-96.

A month later, Lundy agreed to fight Boxcino lightweight tournament champion Petr Petrov on just eight days' notice in the main event of an ESPN telecast at the Turning Stone Resort & Casino in Verona, New York. Lundy missed weight by four pounds and the bout was cancelled.

Lundy fought again on national television on July 11, 2015, this time challenging Mauricio Herrera in the main event on HBO Latino for the vacant NABF 140-pound title. Lundy lost on the scorecards via technical decision when the fight was stopped toward the end of the fifth round due to a pair of cuts over each of Herrera's eyes caused by accidental head-butts. Each judge scored the bout even after four, but judges Eddie Hernandez and Fernando Villareal awarded the partial fifth round to Herrera while Zac Young ruled it an even 10-10 round. Herrera won, 48-47, 48-47, 48-48.

Return to lightweight division
After the bout with Petrov was cancelled, Lundy vowed to return to 135 pounds to silence the critics who suggested he could no longer make that weight in his 30s. On October 17, 2015 Lundy made his long-awaited return to the lightweight division at Mohegan Sun in Connecticut, defeating Carlos Winston Velasquez by fifth-round knockout to capture the vacant WBC Continental Americas Titles. Lundy dominated the fight from the opening bell, dropping Velasquez twice before the referee stopped the bout in the fifth.

First world title shot
After winning in October, Lundy earned his first shot at a world title when he faced reigning World Boxing Organization (WBO) junior welterweight champion Terence Crawford in the main event of HBO's World Championship Boxing Telecast Feb. 27th, 2016 at The Theater at Madison Square Garden. Panned as a second-rate fight for the undefeated Crawford, the bout picked up considerable steam in the weeks leading up to the telecast as Lundy boldly predicted a knockout win. Following a heated press conference in New York City in which Crawford pushed Lundy during their face-off, Crawford stopped Lundy at the 2:09 mark of the fifth round.

Professional boxing record

References

External links

1984 births
Lightweight boxers
Boxers from Philadelphia
Living people
American male boxers
Light-welterweight boxers